Hip Hop Is Dead is the eighth studio album by American rapper Nas, released December 19, 2006, on Def Jam Recordings. His first album for the label, it was co-financed by Nas's previous label, Columbia Records, which once distributed for Def Jam. The album's title was inspired by Nas's view of the music industry and the state of hip hop music at the time. The album features appearances from Nas's then wife Kelis, Kanye West, Jay-Z, will.i.am, Snoop Dogg, The Game and Chrisette Michele, among others.

The album debuted at number one on the U.S. Billboard 200 chart, selling 355,880 copies in its first week. His fourth U.S. number-one album, it had sold 941,000 copies by November 2008,  eventually over time it went platinum by the RIAA. Upon its release, Hip Hop Is Dead received generally positive reviews from most music critics. Hip Hop Is Dead was nominated for a Grammy Award for Best Rap Album, ultimately losing to Kanye West's Graduation at the 50th Grammy Awards.

Background
Nas announced the album's title after a performance on May 18, 2006. In a late September interview on English DJ Tim Westwood's Radio show, Nas said, "Hip-hop is dead because we as artists no longer have the power." He went on to say, "Could you imagine what 50 Cent could be doing, Nas, Jay, Eminem, if we were the Jimmy Iovines? Could you imagine the power we'd have? I think that's where we're headed."  He has described the album as a mixture of "street" records, "political" records and collaborations. In another interview for MTV.com, Nas discussed the concept of the album title and the social atmosphere and condition of the music industry that inspired it, stating:

A promo single, "Where Y'all At", was released in June 2006 and produced by Salaam Remi. It contained a sample from Nas' "Made You Look", but it did not make the final cut for Hip Hop Is Dead. It was, however, released as a bonus track on the Japanese import version of the album.

A music video for "Can't Forget About You" premiered on February 5, 2007, the song featuring Chrisette Michele and sampling  Nat King Cole's song "Unforgettable". Another video, Hustlers, featuring The Game, followed.

Title controversy
In an interview on the music television show 106 & Park, while promoting his untitled 2008 album, Nas said that he chose "Hip Hop Is Dead" as the title of the album in order to engender excitement and a reaction among hip hop artists. He went on to say that it worked, due to reactions from artists like Lil Wayne and Kanye West (whether West was actually reacting to the title of the album or merely promoting the album is unclear, given that he produced on two of the album's tracks). The title had a major impact in the hip hop world, especially for Southern hip hop, whose artists were blamed at the time for cheapening the quality of hip-hop with crunk and snap music. Southern rapper Young Jeezy had made statements against the title of Nas' album, and also furthered his comments by questioning Nas' street credibility. They have since reconciled, with Nas appearing on Jeezy's 2008 single, "My President". Many other Southern rappers such as Ludacris, Trick Daddy, and Big Boi (whose fellow Outkast member, Andre 3000, declared hip hop dead on 2001's "Funkin' Around", off Big Boi and Dre Present...Outkast) have also attacked Nas' album title claiming that it is targeted at Southern hip hop. Nas also has a fair share of supporters such as fellow New York rappers KRS-One, DMX, Raekwon, and Ghostface Killah.

Critical reception

Hip Hop Is Dead received generally positive reviews from most music critics. At Metacritic, which assigns a normalized rating out of 100 to reviews from mainstream critics, the album received an average score of 79, based on 22 reviews, which indicates "generally favorable reviews". Nas is hip-hop's "grumpiest man", according to Jody Rosen for Entertainment Weekly, and the album "is a lot like Nas himself: impossible not to admire, but hard to love". Among those music writers and critics that reviewed Hip Hop Is Dead favorably was Jason Rubin of The A.V. Club, which gave the album an A− rating. Rubin praised the album's production quality and lyrical concept, and stated "Hip Hop is unsparing in its diagnosis of rap's ills, but ultimately, it's hopeful. It contains a smart, tight, cohesive analysis of where rap went astray, but also the seeds of the genre's rebirth and renewal."

Despite perceiving its sound and musical quality as weaknesses, Los Angeles Times writer Soren Baker gave it 3 out of 4 stars and wrote "Nas demonstrates why he remains one of rap's most revered artists, as his defense of hip-hop culture is impassioned and informed, if not fully realized". Sean Fennessey of Vibe called the album "disorienting and sometimes brilliant" and complimented its "bold, startling production and a renewed lyrical vigor". The album was nominated for a Grammy Award for Best Rap Album, losing to Kanye West's Graduation (2007), at the 50th Grammy Awards in February 2008.

Commercial performance
Hip Hop Is Dead debuted at number one on the US Billboard 200, selling 355,880 copies in its first week. The album has joined It Was Written (1996) and I Am… (1999) as Nas's third album to debut at number one on the chart. In its second week, the album dropped to number four on the chart, selling an additional 101,000 copies. In its third week, the album dropped to number eight on the chart, selling 44,800 copies that week. On March 12, 2007, the album was certified gold by the Recording Industry Association of America (RIAA) for sales of over 500,000 copies in the United States.

The title track "Hip Hop Is Dead" (produced by will.i.am), which contains samples from "In-A-Gadda-Da-Vida" by Iron Butterfly, and "Apache" by Incredible Bongo Band (which Nas previously used on "Made You Look", and Billy Squier's "The Big Beat", was the first single of the album. It received airplay on radio stations in Australia (Triple J), the UK, and in United States, notably on Hot 97. The single recently reached #48 on the Hot R&B/Hip-Hop Songs chart and #41 on the Billboard Hot 100. The second single from the album  Hip Hop Is Dead is  "Can't Forget About You" (Featuring Chrisette Michele). It contains a sample from Nat King Cole's "Unforgettable".

Track listing
Information is based on Liner Notes.

Notes
 signifies a co-producer.

Personnel
Unless otherwise indicated, Information is based on Liner Notes.

Charts

Weekly charts

Year-end charts

Certifications

Release history

References

External links
Nas at DefJam

2006 albums
Nas albums
Albums produced by Devo Springsteen
Albums produced by Dr. Dre
Albums produced by Kanye West
Albums produced by L.E.S. (record producer)
Albums produced by Mark Batson
Albums produced by Salaam Remi
Albums produced by Scott Storch
Albums produced by Stargate
Albums produced by will.i.am
Columbia Records albums
Def Jam Recordings albums